Brian Roy Honeywood (born 8 May 1949) is an English former footballer who played in the Football League as a defender for Colchester United.

Club career

Born in Chelmsford, Honeywood began his career at Ipswich Town, going on to make 100 youth team appearances and 46 reserve team appearances, but never broke into the first-team at the club. He joined Colchester United in the summer of 1968, making his first-team debut on the opening day of the 1968–69 season, a 4–0 loss to Brentford on 10 August 1968. Honeywood went on to make 18 league appearances during his single season with the club. He made his final appearance in the final game of the season on 2 May 1969, a 2–0 away defeat to Notts County before joining Chelmsford City.

Managerial career
Following the resignation of Ollie Hopkins as Chelmsford City manager in November 1978, Honeywood was appointed as caretaker manager of the club. Honeywood presided over two games as caretaker manager for Chelmsford, losing 5–0 against Dover in the Southern League and losing 10–2 against Barking in the FA Trophy. Following the defeat against Barking, Chelmsford's heaviest defeat in the club's history, Honeywood was replaced as caretaker manager by Don Walker, who also acted as caretaker manager, before the appointment of former Billericay Town manager John Newman in a permanent capacity.

Personal life

Honeywood now works for Professional Active Soccer Schools (PASS) as a coach alongside his son Lee, who was also on the books with Ipswich, but also failed to break into the first-team at the club, being forced to retire early through injury.

References

1949 births
Living people
Sportspeople from Chelmsford
English footballers
Association football defenders
Ipswich Town F.C. players
Colchester United F.C. players
Chelmsford City F.C. players
Chelmsford City F.C. managers
English Football League players
Association football coaches